Aurora Ruffino (born 22 May 1989) is an Italian actress.

Biography
Aurora Ruffino was born in Turin, the fourth of six children, but was raised in Druento, where she attended elementary and middle school. At age 5 she was orphaned when her mother died in childbirth and her father abandoned the children. She was then raised by her grandparents and aunt. At age 14, she enrolled in a theater course organized by the school. At 19, after graduation, she enrolled in the "Gipsy Musical Academy," a dance and drama school, in Turin.

She made her debut as an actress in the film La solitudine dei numeri primi (2010). After that, she moved to Rome to study at the Centro Sperimentale di Cinematografia (Experimental film centre or Italian National film school), graduating in 2013. In the fall of 2012 she became publicly known for her role as Benedetta Ferraris-Costa in the miniseries Questo nostro amore (This our love) broadcast on Rai 1 and also starring Neri Marcorè and Anna Valle.

She appeared in the official music video for Modà in the song Se si potesse non morire (If you could not die) which placed third in the Festival della Canzone Italiana di Sanremo (San Remo Festival of Italian Songs) in 2013 and which was the soundtrack to the film White as Milk, Red as Blood where she starred as Silvia. In the same year she starred in a short LGBT-themed film called Ad occhi chiusi (Eyes closed).

In 2014 she played a protagonist in the television series Braccialetti Rossi as Cris, a girl suffering from anorexia, and also appeared in Una Ferrari per due and Purché finisca bene, both broadcast by RAI 1.

In October 2014 she reprised her role of Benedetta Ferraris-Costa for the second season of Questo nostro amore, renamed Questo nostro amore 70. Since February 2015 she has re-appeared in the second season of Braccialetti rossi (Red bracelets).

She also starred in some short films directed by Gianluca Testa  and Gabriele Mainetti.

Filmography

Awards and Accolades
Premio Kinéo
2015 - Won - Kinéo Giovani Rivelazioni
Roma Fiction Fest
2014 - Won - Special Jury Prize to the protagonists of the series Braccialetti rossi
Giffoni Film Festival 
2014 - Won - Explosive Talent Award

References

External links
 
 Biography of  Aurora Ruffino profile, FictionTravel.it; accessed 2 March 2016.

1989 births
Actors from Turin
Italian film actresses
Italian stage actresses
Italian television actresses
Living people